Aaron Harlan (September 8, 1802 – January 8, 1868) was a U.S. Representative from Ohio, cousin of Andrew Jackson Harlan.

Born in Warren County, Ohio, Harlan attended a public school and later attended a law school.  He was admitted to the bar and began practice in Xenia, Ohio, in 1825.  He served as member of the Ohio House of Representatives in 1832 and 1833, and he served in the Ohio Senate in 1838, 1839, and 1849.  He moved to a farm near Yellow Springs, Ohio in 1841 and continued the practice of law. He was a Presidential elector in 1844 for Clay/Frelinghuysen.  He served as delegate to the State constitutional convention in 1850.  He served as member of the board of trustees of Antioch College in 1852.

Harlan was elected as a Whig to the Thirty-third Congress, reelected as an Opposition Party candidate to the Thirty-fourth Congress, and elected as a Republican to the Thirty-fifth Congresses (March 4, 1853 – March 4, 1859).
He was an unsuccessful candidate for reelection in 1858, to the Thirty-sixth Congress and in 1861 to fill a vacancy in the Thirty-seventh Congress.  He resumed the practice of law and engaged in agricultural pursuits near Yellow Springs.  He served as lieutenant colonel of the Ninety-fourth Regiment of Minutemen of Ohio in 1862.

Harlan moved to San Francisco, California, in 1864 and resided there until his death on January 8, 1868.
He was interred in Laurel Hill Cemetery.

References

Sources 
 
 
 

1802 births
1868 deaths
People from Warren County, Ohio
Whig Party members of the United States House of Representatives from Ohio
Opposition Party members of the United States House of Representatives from Ohio
Republican Party members of the United States House of Representatives from Ohio
1844 United States presidential electors
Republican Party members of the Ohio House of Representatives
Republican Party Ohio state senators
Ohio Constitutional Convention (1850)
People from Yellow Springs, Ohio
Ohio lawyers
19th-century American lawyers
Burials at Laurel Hill Cemetery (San Francisco)